Skorovatn is a village in the municipality of Namsskogan in Trøndelag county, Norway. The old Skorovas Gruber mine is here, but it closed in 1984. Skorovatn is located right on the border with the municipality of Røyrvik, just south of the lake Tunnsjøflyan and the large lake Tunnsjøen. Skorovatn Chapel is located in the village.

Mine

The Skorovas Gruber mine was the first in Norway to exploit a sulphide ore deposit and produced zinc and copper.  The mine discharged tailings into a nearby lake, but the contamination from this process has been deemed relatively slight.  The mine closed in 1984.  Before its closing, virtually everyone that lived in and around Skorovatn worked directly or indirectly for the mining operation.

References

Villages in Trøndelag
Namsskogan